Saïdou Sow (born 4 July 2002) is a Guinean professional footballer who plays as a defender for  club Saint-Étienne and the Guinea national team.

Club career 
Sow made his professional debut for Saint-Étienne on 3 October 2020, in a Ligue 1 game against Lens, replacing Maxence Rivera at  the 16th minute, after the early expulsion of Timothée Kolodziejczak.

International career 
On 10 October 2020, Sow made his international debut for Guinea in a friendly game against Cape Verde, entering as a substitute and proving to be instrumental in his side 2–1 win by making the assist for Yady Bangoura's decisive goal.

References

External links

ASSE profile

2002 births
Living people
Guinean footballers
Guinea international footballers
Association football defenders
AS Saint-Étienne players
Ligue 1 players
Ligue 2 players
Championnat National 3 players
2021 Africa Cup of Nations players